Joe Simpson (born 4 May 1984) is an English figurative painter based in London. His work is influenced by cinematography to create frozen scenes detached from a wider context. His work has been shown internationally, including in the National Portrait Gallery, The Royal Albert Hall, House of Commons, Air Gallery, The Hospital (Covent Gardens) and Manchester Art Gallery.

In 2009 Simpson’s first major exhibition ‘Almost There’ launched.  Simpson collaborated with twelve bands and solo artists (including The Miserable Rich, Nizlopi, The Voluntary Butler Scheme, New Cassettes and Jose Vanders) to create a series of paintings that have an accompanying original soundtrack. Each painting had a song written specifically for that piece, inspired by the scene and composed to complement the mood of the image. The paintings were exhibited with headphones beside them, so that you could simultaneously listen to the music and view the image. The visual and audio components come together to create one new piece of art.

In 2011 Simpson produced a series of portraits of famous musicians, with subject including Brandon Flowers, Mark Ronson, Ezra Koenig (Vampire Weekend), Maxi Jazz (Faithless), Paloma Faith, Matt Berninger (The National), Sam Beam (Iron & Wine) and Jamie Cullum. The exhibition launched in a pop up in Soho and then was displayed as a solo exhibition at The Royal Albert Hall.  Simpson's portrait of Maxi Jazz (Faithless) was shortlisted for the BP Portrait Award and exhibited at The National Portrait Gallery.

His next major series of paintings was titled 'Across America' and depicted scenes from the artist's trip in the United States.  The paintings were exhibited at Reuben Colley Fine Arts in Birmingham in 2013.

Since 2014 Simpson has been working on a new project entitled 'Act', where he is painting a series of British actors in their dream role.  He is asking each actor, 'what role have you always wanted to play but have never got the chance?' and then he creates a narrative painting depicting them playing that part. These roles may be from scripts that never got made, or characters from novels or plays that they would love to play, or any other interpretations of the question. So far he has painted Paddy Considine, Warwick Davis, Michael Sheen, Olivia Colman, Eleanor Tomlinson and Matt Lucas for the series.

References

External links 
Joe Simpson Official Website
NME - Joe Simpson's Paintings of Rock Stars
Pitchfork Review 'Ezra Koenig, Matt Berninger, Sam Beam Immortalized in Oil Paintings' 2011
Paste Magazine 'Artist Creates Oil Paintings of Iron & Wine, The National, Vampire Weekend' 2011
Topman Contribute - Musician Portraits by Joe Simpson

Under The Radar 'Popular Musicians and Songwriters Become Oil Paintings' 2011
BBC Manchester Feature 2009

1984 births
Living people
20th-century English painters
English male painters
21st-century English painters
People from Lancaster, Lancashire
20th-century English male artists
21st-century English male artists